The Benz Bz.II (manufacturer's designation Benz Type FD) was a six-cylinder, water-cooled, inline engine developed in Germany for use in aircraft in 1913.
It had cast-iron cylinders with sheet metal cooling jackets welded to them. The two overhead valves per cylinder were operated via pushrods and rocker arms by a single camshaft embedded in the engine block on the right-hand side.

Applications
 Albatros W.5
 Hansa-Brandenburg B.I

Specifications

References

Bibliography

1910s aircraft piston engines